Live! Coast to Coast is a live album by the R&B crooner Teddy Pendergrass. It was recorded in Philadelphia in 1978 and Los Angeles in 1979. It did rather well on the Billboard album charts, reaching #33 Pop and #5 R&B.

Track listing
All tracks composed by Kenny Gamble and Leon Huff; except where indicated

Disc 1
 "Life Is a Song Worth Singing" (Thom Bell, Linda Creed)
 "Only You"
 Medley: "If You Don't Know Me by Now/The Love I Lost/Bad Luck/Wake Up Everybody" (Victor Carstarphen, Kenny Gamble, Leon Huff, Gene McFadden, John Whitehead)
 "When Somebody Loves You Back"
 "Get Up, Get Down, Get Funky, Get Loose"

Disc 2
 "L.A. Rap"
 "Come Go with Me"
 "Close the Door"
 "Turn Off the Lights"
 "Do Me"
 Live Interview with Mimi Brown of WDAS-FM, Philadelphia
 "It's You I Love"
 Live Interview
 "Shout and Scream"
 Live Interview Concludes

Personnel
Teddy Pendergrass - vocals
Bobby Eli, Robert "Wawa" Le Grand - guitar
Jimmy Williams, Norman Smith, Philip McClelland - bass
Jerry Cohen, Leon Ware - keyboards
Alfie Pollitt - piano
Lenny Pakula - organ
Cecil Du Valle - organ, clavinet, synthesizer
James Carter, Keith Benson, Quinton Joseph - drums
Gregory L. Moore, David Cruse - percussion
Sam Reed - saxophone, flute
Arthur T. Pugh Jr., Louis Opalesky Jr., Sylvester Bryant - trumpet, flugelhorn
Joseph A. Kohanski Jr. - trombone
John Petrella, Peter M. Kucirko - cello
Emma Kummrow, Florence Rosensweig, Grace S. Babogh, Richard E. Jones, Roger J. Harrington, Thomas Di Sarlo - violin
Sharon Ray, Susan M. Leon - viola
Barbara Ingram, Carla Benson, Evette, Benton, Harriet Tharp, Melva Story, Sherry Williams - backing vocals
Karat Faye - Engineer @ Record Plant L.A.

Charts

Singles

References

External links
Live! Coast to Coast at Discogs

Teddy Pendergrass albums
1979 live albums
Albums produced by Kenneth Gamble
Albums produced by Leon Huff
Philadelphia International Records live albums